Tchaikovsky & Beethoven Violin Concertos  is the name of one of three conventional classical albums by classical musician Vanessa-Mae before her rise to pop stardom. It was recorded in 1990.

Track listing
Tchaikovsky: Violin Concerto in D, OP. 35 32:14 

1. Allegro moderato - Allegro giusto 17:19 
 
2. Canzonetta: Andante 5:54 
 
3. Finale: Allegro vivacissimo 9:06

Beethoven: Violin Concerto in D, Op. 61 40:42

4. Allegro, ma non troppo (22:42) 
 
5. Larghetto (8:05) 
 
6. Rondo allegro (9:50) 
 
London Symphony Orchestra conducted by Kees Bakels

"Total: 73:04"

1991 classical albums
Vanessa-Mae albums